Wrzeszcz (pronounced ,) is one of the boroughs of the Northern Polish city of Gdańsk.

History 
The current name Wrzeszcz comes from the old name of the area – Wrzost, which derives from wrzos, a Polish and  word for heather. The area of modern Wrzeszcz used to be forest and fields of heather.

Historical sources mention Vriezst in 1263 AD and Vriest 1283 as a place of a mill and by the end of the 13th century the Cistercian Monks of Oliwa owned four or five water mills on the Strieß (Strzyża), the creek running through Wrzeszcz. Vriest is Low German as well as Dutch language word meaning  frost.

In 1412 AD, this suburban village was granted to Danzig city councillor Gerd von der Beke, an ally of the Teutonic Knights. The place was known as Langfuhr in the German language.

Early area landowners included the Bischof family, who held the increasingly residential settlement in the late-16th century and early-17th century, and the Köhne family, which started acquiring possessions in the Langfuhr area in 1616 AD. Danzig patrician Zacharias Zappio acquired most of the land between today's Slowackiego and Do Studzienki streets and built a palace there. When King John III Sobieski visited the palace in 1677 AD, the little valley where the palace was located was renamed Königstal (Dolina Krolewska), or King's Valley, to commemorate the occasion.

Between 1767 and 1770, Danzig mayor Daniel Gralath made a personal project of turning the two kilometers of old road between Langfuhr and Danzig proper into the four-lane, tree-lined Grand Avenue, as it was then renamed. Each lane of the avenue was lined by 350 trees imported from the Netherlands, and the entire cost of the project was the immense sum (for the time) of 100,000 guilders.

In the 18th century, residential construction aimed at the wealthy city folk took precedence. The erected residences were mostly classical style with beautiful gardens and the obligatory tree-lined driveways. By 1804, Langfuhr had about 900 residents, most of them working in breweries, distilleries, retailers, and factories making a kind of ash used to bleach cloth.

On 6 December 1807, under French occupation, the Danzig-Prussian convention made the town part of the Napoleonic Free City of Danzig. After the Congress of Vienna of 1814–1815, Danzig was reincorporated into Prussia.

From the mid-19th century onwards, Langfuhr grew to become a fashionable and wealthy borough with beautifully decorated city villas for wealthier residents and even spacious accommodation for local labourers. In 1872, Langfuhr was joined to Danzig by a horse-drawn tram along the Grand Avenue.

In 1904, the Königliche Technische Hochschule zu Danzig Grand Hall was built, soon followed by the city hospital, which is now the medical academy.  Until 1919 Langfuhr was the garrison of the 1st Life Hussar Regiment (since 1901 Brigade) with large barracks built in the 1890s. In 1910 the first airfield of Danzig was established on the hussar's parade ground. After World War I Erhard Milch's "Danziger Luftpost GmbH" (Danzig Airmail) and the "Lloyd Ostflug" were located at Langfuhr.

Effects of World War II 
After World War II the town became part of Poland according to the Potsdam Conference and renamed to the Polish Wrzeszcz. Its German inhabitants either fled before the advancing Red Army or were expelled. The renaming was based on medieval records but caused the protests of the arriving Polish settlers as it was regarded unpronounceable and has a similarity to the Polish term "wrzeszczeć" (bellow).

Present 

The airport was replaced by the Gdańsk Lech Wałęsa Airport in 1974 and large housing complexes have been built on the former airport area.

The borough is now developing rapidly. A great deal of commercial activity (particularly banking and shopping) now takes place in Wrzeszcz. A number of international firms such as Citibank, ING Bank, Fortis Bank, and Shell have chosen to locate their offices there rather than in the Gdańsk city center, large shopping centers such as Galeria Bałtycka and Centrum Handlowe Manhattan are opening along Grunwaldzka Street, and extensive military properties have been sold to housing developers.

Notable residents 
 Eddi Arent (1925–2013), actor
 Hermann Balck (1893–1982), general
 Alfred Dannebaum (1918–1999), Nazi Germany officer
 Siegfried Freytag (1919–2003), Luftwaffe pilot
 Günter Grass  (1927–2015), author
 Ulrich Kessler (1894–1983), Luftwaffe general
 Leopold Koss (1920–2012), cytopathologist
 Gerda Steinhoff (1922–1946), Nazi SS concentration camp overseer hung for war crimes
 Joachim von Tresckow (1894–1958), Wehrmacht general
 Wolfgang Völz (1930–2018), actor

Points of interest 
 Gdańsk University of Technology (Politechnika Gdańska)
 Gdańsk Medical University
 Baltic Opera
 Gdańsk Wrzeszcz railway station
 Johannes Gutenberg monument, founded 22 June 1890 at Gutenberghain 
 
 Garden city Nowe Szkoty

References

External links

Districts of Gdańsk